Paattali is a 1999 Indian Tamil-language drama film directed by K. S. Ravikumar. The film stars Sarath Kumar, Ramya Krishnan and Devayani. It was released on 17 December 1999 and became a commercial success.

Plot
Shanmugam is the grandson of the rich landlord Kulasekaran based at the Karamadai area in the Coimbatore District of Tamil Nadu. Upon his parents' early death, Kulasekaran transfers all his wealth to Shanmugam and passes away. Shanmugam is raised by his paternal aunt Lakshmi. However, Lakshmi's husband Rajarathinam is greedy about money and tries to kill Shanmugam. To save Shanmugam from her cruel husband, Lakshmi lies with the help of their family lawyer Naachiyappan that the entire wealth is transferred to her name and let Shanmugam grow as a servant in the same home.

Shanmugam is very fond of Lakshmi and treats her as his own mother. Shanmugam falls in love with Shakuntala who is employed in the same house. Kannamma is the only daughter of Lakshmi and she returns to the village post completion of her studies from abroad. While Lakshmi dreams of marrying Kannamma to Shanmugam, she has other plans. Kannamma discloses that she is in love with her classmate Raja. Although not interested, Lakshmi agrees for the wedding. 
One day, Shanmugam is sick and Sakunthala plays a prank on him without knowing by making him jump in the river which makes his condition worse. However, Shakuntala saves him, but Shanmugam shivers in cold. Accidentally, they both enter into a physical relationship and Shanmugam promises to marry her. Meanwhile, on the day of Kannamma's marriage, Raja and his parents cancel the wedding knowing that all their properties actually belong to Shanmugam only. Rajarathinam gets shocked knowing the truth. To save the life of Kannamma, Lakshmi requests Shanmugam to marry her. As Shanmugam could not turn down her request, he agrees and marries Kannamma.

To Shanmugam's shock, Shakuntala gets pregnant so she decides to leave the village as she does not want to interrupt Shanmugam's life once again. But Shanmugam stops her and accommodates her in their farmhouse, which is managed by Mani, Rajarathinam's sidekick who was a corrupt person but has just reformed after seeing their sacrifices for each other and feels proud of them. Shanmugam secretly visits Shakuntala and takes her to hospital for periodical check-up. Kannamma also visits the same doctor once and she spots Shanmugam and Shakuntala together. Kannamma feels heartbroken but understands the situation of Shanmugam. Shakuntala discloses the truth and speaks in favour of Shanmugam. Rajarathinam's henchmen try to kill Shakuntala and her baby. But she is saved by Kannamma and the baby is delivered successfully. Shanmugam, with a greater upper hand, fights with and defeats both his own uncle and his henchmen. Finally, Shanmugam is married to Shakuntala but begins a fresh life with Kannamma, on Shakuntala's advice and hence the movie ends with a happy ending.

Cast

Sarath Kumar as Shanmugam
Ramya Krishnan as Kannamma, Shanmugam's wife and Lakshmi's daughter
Devayani as Shakuntala, Shanmugam's love interest
Sujatha as Lakshmi, Kannamma's mother and Shanmugam's paternal aunt
Manivannan as Mani, Rajarathinam's sidekick
Anandaraj as Rajarathinam, Kannamma's father and Shanmugam's uncle
Vadivelu as Velan alias Vadivu
Kovai Sarala as Sarala, Velan's love interest
Vinu Chakravarthy as Kulasekaran, Lakshmi's father and Shanmugam's grandfather
R. Sundarrajan as Kaalaiyan, Shakuntala's father
Anu Mohan as Avudaiappan, Vadivu's to be imagined brother
Crane Manohar as Senthil
Pandu as Lawyer Naachiyappan
Bharath Kalyan as Raja, Kannamma's ex-fiance
Vasu Vikram as Rajarathinam's henchman
Idichapuli Selvaraj as a servant
K. Natraj as Rathnam
Kallukkul Eeram Ramanathan as a servant
Halwa Vasu as a villager
Chaplin Balu as Vadivu's uncle
Kovai Senthil as a priest
Master Mahendran as Young Shanmugam
Hemalatha as Young Shakuntala
K. S. Ravikumar as a flower decorator (cameo appearance)
Cheenu Mohan as a servant

Production
During the making of the film, Sarathkumar dislocated his left hand during a stunt accident, and shooting was stalled for two weeks. Meena was first offered the role, but could not sign on as a result of her commitment to Vikraman's Vaanathaippola (2000) and was replaced by Ramya Krishnan.

Soundtrack
The music was composed by S. A. Rajkumar.

Reception
K. N. Vijiyan of New Straits Times praised Ramya Krishnan and Devayani for their acting, and criticised the weak plot. Deccan Herald  wrote, "This Sharath Kumar starrer by K S Ravi Kumar is not bad at all. For anybody with an interest in the Tamil character, this is a must see".

References

External links
 

1999 films
1990s Tamil-language films
Films directed by K. S. Ravikumar
Films scored by S. A. Rajkumar
Indian action drama films
1990s action drama films